The 680th Radar Squadron is an inactive United States Air Force unit. It was last assigned to the 20th Air Division, Aerospace Defense Command, stationed at Palermo Air Force Station, New Jersey. It was inactivated on 30 May 1970.

The unit was a General Surveillance Radar squadron providing for the air defense of the United States.

Lineage
 Established as the 680th Aircraft Control and Warning Squadron
 Activated on 1 March 1951
 Discontinued on 1 July 1960
 Redesignated as the 680th Radar Squadron (SAGE)
 Organized on 1 June 1962
 Inactivated on 30 May 1970

Assignments
 545th Aircraft Control and Warning Group, 1 March 1951
 29th Air Division, 6 February 1952
 4702d Defense Wing, 16 February 1953
 9th Air Division, 8 October 1954
 25th Air Division, 15 August 1958
 4700th Air Defense Wing, 1 September 1958
 25th Air Division, 15 May 1960 - 1 July 1960
 New York Air Defense Sector, 1 June 1962
 21st Air Division, 1 April 1966
 35th Air Division, 1 December 1967
 33d Air Division, 1 April 1968
 20th Air Division, 19 November 1969 - 30 May 1970

Stations
 Yaak AFS, Montana, 1 March 1951 – 1 July 1960
 Palermo AFS, New Jersey, 1 June 1962 – 30 May 1970

References

  Cornett, Lloyd H. and Johnson, Mildred W., A Handbook of Aerospace Defense Organization  1946 - 1980,  Office of History, Aerospace Defense Center, Peterson AFB, CO (1980).
 Winkler, David F. & Webster, Julie L., Searching the Skies, The Legacy of the United States Cold War Defense Radar Program,  US Army Construction Engineering Research Laboratories, Champaign, IL (1997).

External links

Radar squadrons of the United States Air Force
Aerospace Defense Command units